Major-General Sir George Adam Wood CB K.St.V KCH KMT (176722 April 1831) was a British Army officer who served in the Peninsular War and fought at the Battle of Waterloo on 18June 1815.

Biography
He was born the son of Lieutenant Adam Wood (d. 1773), who served with Captain Coote's Independent Company of Foot based at Landguard Fort, and Francis (d. 2January 1822).

After passing through the Royal Military Academy at Woolwich, London, he received a commission as second lieutenant in the Royal Artillery on 24May 1781. His further commissions were dated: lieutenant, 15May 1790; captain-lieutenant, 7January 1795; captain, 3December 1800; major, 24July 1806; lieutenant-colonel, 1February 1808; brevet colonel, 4June 1814; regimental colonel, 11May 1820; major-general, 27May 1825. He served with the army under the Duke of York in Flanders in the campaigns of 1793 to 1795, taking part in the principal operations. Shortly after his return to England he went to the West Indies, and was present under Sir Ralph Abercromby at the capture of Saint Lucia in May 1796, and of Saint Vincent in June of that year. In February 1797 he sailed with Abercromby's expedition from Martinique to the Gulf of Paria, was at the capture of Trinidad on 17February, and at the subsequent unsuccessful attempt on Puerto Rico.

Wood served with distinction in the Mediterranean from 1806 until 1808; he then went to Portugal, took part in Sir John Moore's campaign, was at the Battle of Coruña on 16January 1809, and returned with the British army to England. In July he was in the expedition under the Earl of Chatham to Walcheren, and was at the siege of Flushing and its capture on 14August. He was knighted on 22May 1812. He commanded the Royal Artillery of the army under Sir Thomas Graham (afterwards Lord Lynedoch), which co-operated with the allies in Holland and Flanders. Landing at Rotterdam in December 1813, he was at the Siege of Antwerp in January 1814, and at the action of Merxem on 13January 1814. He was at the unsuccessful assault on Bergen op Zoom on 8March, and the subsequent blockade of that place and of Antwerp. For his services he received brevet promotion, and was made an aide-de-camp to King George IV.

In 1815 Wood commanded the whole of the royal artillery in the Waterloo Campaign, in the battles of Quatre Bras (16 June) and of Waterloo (18 June), in the march to Paris and the operations against the fortresses of Maubeuge, Landrecy, Mariembourg, Philippeville, and Cambray, and at the entry into Paris on 7 July. For his services in this campaign Wood was mentioned in despatches, was made a Companion of the Order of the Bath (CB) on the 22May 1812 and knighted when proxy to Sir J. C. Sherbrooke. He also received the Waterloo Medal, and was permitted to accept and wear the insignia of the fourth class of the Order of St. Vladimir (K.St.V) of Russia, the third class of the Order of Wilhelm of the Netherlands, and the knighthood of the Military Order of Maria Theresa (KMT) of Austria. The following year he was made a knight commander of the royal Royal Hanoverian Guelphic Order (KCH). He commanded the British artillery of the army of occupation in France until 1819, when he returned to England.

He was appointed Governor of Carlisle on 24June 1825 and died in London on 22April 1831.

References

Bibliography

1767 births
1831 deaths
British Army personnel of the Napoleonic Wars
Royal Artillery officers
Companions of the Order of the Bath
British Army generals
British Army personnel of the French Revolutionary Wars
Recipients of the Order of St. Vladimir, 4th class
Recipients of the Waterloo Medal
Knights Third Class of the Military Order of William
Knights Bachelor